The rufous-rumped foliage-gleaner (Philydor erythrocercum) is a species of bird in the family Furnariidae.
It is found in Bolivia, Brazil, Colombia, Ecuador, French Guiana, Guyana, Peru, and Suriname.
Its natural habitats are subtropical or tropical moist lowland forest and subtropical or tropical moist montane forest.

References

rufous-rumped foliage-gleaner
Birds of the Amazon Basin
Birds of the Guianas
rufous-rumped foliage-gleaner
Birds of Brazil
Taxonomy articles created by Polbot